SPANphos is an organophosphorus compound used as a ligand in organometallic and coordination chemistry. The compound is a rare example of a trans-spanning ligand and rigidly links mutually trans coordination sites. By virtue of its  C2-symmetric backbone, SPANphos forms a chiral cavity over the face of a square planar complexes, e.g. in MCl2(SPANphos) (M = Pd, Pt).

Synthesis
SPANphos can be prepared synthesized from relatively inexpensive reagents. In the first step 4,4,4',4',6,6'-hexamethyl-2,2'-spirobichromane is prepared via an acid-catalyzed reaction of p-cresol and acetone. The resultant spirocycle is halogenated with N-bromosuccinimide followed by lithium-bromide exchange using n-BuLi. Treatment of the resulting dilithio compound with chlorodiphenylphosphine completes the synthesis.

References

Diphosphines